Gorosthaney Sabdhan (Bengali: গোরস্থানে সাবধান) is a 2010 thriller film directed by Sandip Ray based on the novel of the same name by Satyajit Ray. The film was released on 10 December 2010. It is different from most other Feluda stories, in the sense that this story is based on Feluda's hometown Kolkata (Calcutta). Most of Feluda's adventures take place as he and his company go to visit some place in India or outside. Here, however, Calcutta itself is the setting. It is the fourth film of the New Feluda franchise as well as the sequel of Tintorettor Jishu.

Plot

By accident, more than anything else, the three find themselves beside the grave of Thomas Godwin. The grave was dug up by some miscreants for unknown reasons. The rather colorful history of Mr. Godwin makes Feluda curious to know more about the man. From the diary of Thomas' daughter Charlotte, Feluda finds that a very precious clock went to Thomas' grave with him. To his surprise, Feluda finds that another party knows about this clock and they are trying to get it aided by the letter with them. Thanks to the brilliance of the detective and the help of 'Haripodobabu', the chauffeur of Mr. Ganguli, a new introduction in this book, their plot is foiled.

The Old Calcutta: for a long time, Calcutta was the capital of British India. Just as the story of the Nawabs plays a vital part in 'Badshahi Angti' (based on Lucknow), the story of British families who lived in the former capital of the British Raj, plays a prominent part in this story. Feluda goes to a Christian cemetery, to see the graves of the members of the Godwin family. He goes to Ripon Lane to meet a living member of the family. Later on, he finds that there is an Anglo-Indian branch of the family as well.

Cast
 Sabyasachi Chakrabarty as Feluda
 Saheb Bhattacharya as Topshe
 Bibhu Bhattacharya as Jatayu
 Dwijen Bandopadhyay as Priyabrata Sikdar
 Dhritiman Chatterjee as Mahadeb Chowdhury
 Subhashish Mukherjee as William Girindranath Biswas
 Haradhan Bandopadhyay As Sidhu Jetha
 Tinnu Anand as Marcus Godwin
 Pradip Mukherjee as Michael Narendranath Biswas
Tamal Ray Chowdhury as Mr. Arakis

External links

 Gorosthane Shabdhan - a walk through Victorian Calcutta

Indian children's films
2010 films
2010s Bengali-language films
Bengali-language Indian films
Feluda (series)
Films based on Indian novels
Indian detective films
Films directed by Sandip Ray
Films set in Kolkata
Films with screenplays by Satyajit Ray
2010s thriller films